Paul Larkins (born 19 May 1963) is a retired English middle-distance runner and a sub 4 minute miler. He still ranks in the all time British Top 30 for 1,500m.

After his competitive career, Larkins went into journalism becoming Editor of both Athletics Weekly and Running Fitness. He is now Production Editor on Practical Classics, a classic car publication and Editor of Trail Running, an off-road running magazine.

Personal bests

External links
Paul Larkins page at Athletics Data

1963 births
British magazine editors
British male middle-distance runners
Living people